Les Wallace (born 22 February 1962) is a Scottish retired professional darts player. He adopted the nickname "McDanger", coming out for his matches dressed in a traditional kilt. He won the 1997 BDO World Darts Championship which is one of the two versions of the World Professional Darts Championship.

Career

Wallace reached the final of the 1993 Winmau World Masters, losing to Steve Beaton. He won the title five years later, beating Alan Warriner in the final.

Wallace made his first appearance at the World Championship in 1995, losing a first round match to Raymond van Barneveld. His assault on the 1996 Championship ended at the hands of the defending world champion, Richie Burnett in the semi-finals.

After defeating Bob Taylor in the first round, Wallace avenged his defeat by van Barneveld in 1997, beating him 3–2 in the second round. He went on to win the World Championship with further wins against Paul Williams and Mervyn King and a 6–3 victory over Welshman Marshall James in the final. Wallace became the first left-handed player to win a World Championship (either PDC or BDO).

He never consolidated his position after winning the World Championship in 1997. He managed only two more match victories at Lakeside, the venue of the BDO Worlds. The defence of his title ended with a second round loss to Steve Beaton (another former World Champion). Wallace was beaten again by van Barneveld in 1999 (2nd Round) having had darts at double to win, and Wallace went out to Ritchie Davies in the first round in 2000 – he hasn't qualified to play at the World Championship since.

End of career
Wallace's private life was a major contributor to his withdrawal from the full-time darts circuit. At one of his court cases, his solicitor Charles Thomas told the court that Wallace's life dramatically changed in 1999 when his partner, Carol, lost premature twins who were four days old. That led to the collapse of the relationship and his alcohol consumption became greater.

He effectively withdrew from the full-time circuit in 1999, although he still participated in some BDO tournaments – including the World Masters in 2000 and 2003 – losing his first match on both occasions. His only televised appearance since came in an exhibition match before the World Darts Trophy final in 2006 – when he played in a Legends match against Bobby George.

He has made some attempts to revive his career in recent years and won the Hampshire Open in 2004. In the 2010 Hampshire Open he won three early round matches, but was eliminated at the last 64 stage to K.Gamblin, he received an invitation to compete in the preliminary round of the 2010 competition, but was beaten in his first match.

In addition, he attended the PDC Qualifying School event in January 2012. He gained a two-year PDC tour card after finishing 23rd in the Q School Order of Merit.

Personal life
Wallace has flirted with the law on several occasions. After a 1996 court appearance, he was fined £210 and banned for 12 months for driving with excess alcohol, having no insurance and failing to stop.

Wallace, who is a father of four, was given a two-week suspended prison sentence for failing to pay £778.73 of council tax in February 2001. He owed the money to Southampton City Council for failing to pay for the period 1 April 1997 (the year in which he won £38,000 for winning the World Championship) to 31 May 2000.

He admitted non-payment of council tax and was warned that he will be jailed unless he keeps up his repayments. The magistrates were told that he had financial problems and could not afford to pay the debts.

Later in 2001, he received a four-month jail sentence after admitting dangerous driving. He received a three-year ban from driving in addition to the custodial sentence.

World Championship results

BDO
 1995: First round (lost to Raymond van Barneveld 2–3) (sets) 
 1996: Semi-finals (lost to Richie Burnett 2–5)
 1997: Winner (beat Marshall James 6–3)
 1998: Second round (lost to Steve Beaton 2–3)
 1999: Second round (lost to Raymond van Barneveld 2–3)
 2000: First round (lost to Ritchie Davies 0–3)

WSDT
 2022: First round (lost to John Walton 2–3)
 2023: First round (lost to Darryl Fitton 2–3)

References

External links
Profile and stats on Darts Database

Scottish darts players
English darts players
BDO world darts champions
1962 births
Living people
British Darts Organisation players
Professional Darts Corporation former tour card holders